Nyumanzi Refugee Settlement is a refugee camp in Adjumani District in northwestern Uganda. Established in 2014, it hosts about 52,000 South Sudanese refugees.

Background 
After opening in January 2014, Nyumanzi has become the largest refugee settlement in Adjumani district in terms of population size of approximately 43,000 men, women, and children.

Nyumanzi refugee settlement is largely populated by refugees from South Sudan  of mainly the tribes of Nuer, Madi, Dinka and so on. Nyumanzi refugee settlement is home to more than 20,000 long-term refugees displaced by the conflict in South Sudan.

239,335 refugees from South Sudan are being hosted in this refugee settlement of Nyumanzi refugee settlement.

Healthcare Services 
The settlement is served by one government-run Health Centre III and various private health facilities owned by refugees and nationals.

Education 
Nyumanzi refugee settlement though being the largest in Adjumani District has only 6 schools in total with three being primary schools and the rest preschools, where more than 4,000 children go everyday, these schools where all established by the Building Tomorrow one NGO that has greatly being supporting Education in Adjumani and part of South Sudan.

The settlement also has 1 secondary school and 1 technical school, run by Windle Trust (now Windle International Uganda) and Norwegian Refugees Council respectively.

Water and sanitation 
In August 2014, LWF - Lutheran World Federation signed an agreement with UNICEF, aimed at reducing waterborne disease and supply strains.

Violence in the settlement 
In December 2019, a violent clash occurred between the refugees and the host tribe which left 2 refugees dead, many injured and an unknown number of the host tribesmen seriously injured. This was sparked by claims that a local Ma'di businessman was killed by refugees.

But, as the settlement is mainly occupied by the Dinka tribe, there are very few cases of violence in the camp among the refugees

References 

Refugee camps in Uganda
Adjumani District
Populated places in Uganda